A complete filmography of Cameron Mitchell from 1945 to 2018.


Films

Television

External links
 

Male actor filmographies
American filmographies